The third season of the NBC American supernatural drama series Grimm was announced on April 26, 2013. It consisted of 22 episodes. The series, created by David Greenwalt, Jim Kouf and Stephen Carpenter, follows a descendant of the Grimm line, Nick Burkhardt, as he deals with being a cop, and trying not to expose his secret as a Grimm.

Cast

Main cast
 David Giuntoli as Nick Burkhardt
 Russell Hornsby as Hank Griffin
 Bitsie Tulloch as Juliette Silverton
 Silas Weir Mitchell as Monroe
 Sasha Roiz as Captain Sean Renard
 Reggie Lee as Sergeant Drew Wu
 Bree Turner as Rosalee Calvert
 Claire Coffee as Adalind Schade

Recurring cast
Damien Puckler as Martin Meisner
Christian Lagadec as Sebastien
 Alexis Denisof as Viktor Chlodwig zu Schellendorf von Konigsburg
 Shohreh Aghdashloo as Stefania Vaduva Popescu
 Jacqueline Toboni as Theresa "Trubel" Rubel
 Dee Wallace as Alice
 Chris Mulkey as Bart
 Danny Bruno as Bud Wurstner
Laura Faye Smith as DeEtta Calvert
 Sharon Leal as Zuri Ellis
 Alicia Lagano as Alicia
 Mary Elizabeth Mastrantonio as Kelly Burkhardt
Bryar Freed-Golden as Gloria Calvert

Production
On April 26, 2013, NBC announced that the series had been renewed for a third season with a 22-episode order. Filming began on July 15 for an October 25 premiere.

Episodes

Ratings

DVD release

References

2013 American television seasons
2014 American television seasons
Season 3